Omer Enrique (Molleda) Muñoz (born June 3rd, 1966 in Maracaibo, Venezuela) served as the interim first base coach for the Chicago White Sox in 2010 while Harold Baines recovered from right knee replacement surgery. He has also played, coached and managed in the minor leagues.

Playing career
Muñoz played from 1985 to 1996 consecutively, save for the 1986 season. In 741 minor league games, the middle infielder hit .264 with 12 home runs.

Managing career
Muñoz managed the AZL Mariners from 2000 to 2001, the Everett Aqua Sox in 2002 (replacing manager Robert Hansen partway through the season), the Bakersfield Blaze in 2003 and Kannapolis Intimidators in 2006.

References

Living people
1966 births
Minor league baseball players
Chicago White Sox coaches
Bakersfield Blaze coaches
Sportspeople from Maracaibo